Museum of Art and History may refer to:

Musée d'Art et d'Histoire, Saint-Denis, France
Musée d'art et d'Histoire (Fribourg), Switzerland
Musée d'Art et d'Histoire (Geneva), Switzerland
Musée d'Art et d'Histoire du Judaïsme, Paris, France
Museum für Kunst und Kulturgeschichte, Dortmund, Germany
Royal Museums of Art and History, Brussels, Belgium
Art & History Museum, Brussels, Belgium
Santa Cruz Museum of Art and History, California, United States
Westphalian State Museum of Art and Cultural History, Münster, Germany